The Neo-Assyrian Text Corpus Project is an international scholarly project aimed at collecting and publishing ancient Assyrian texts and studies based on them. Its headquarters are in Helsinki in Finland.

State Archives of Assyria

State Archives of Assyria Cuneiform Texts

State Archives of Assyria Studies

See also
Epic of Gilgamesh
Text corpus

References
Cole, S.  Nippur in Late Assyrian Times, c. 755-612 BC, by Steven W. Cole, (The Neo-Assyrian Text Corpus Project, University of Helsinki, by Vammalan Kirjapaino Oy, Finland), c 1996.
Novotny, J.  The Standard Babylonian Etana Epic, by Jamie R. Novotny, (University of Helsinki, Ibid.), c 2001.

External links
 Official page, University of Helsinki

Archaeological corpora
Linguistic research
Applied linguistics
Corpora